Desbordes is a surname. Notable people with the surname include:

 Gustave Borgnis-Desbordes (1839–1900), French general
 Henri Desbordes (died c.1722), French printer in Amsterdam
 Marceline Desbordes-Valmore (1786–1859), French poet and novelist
 Mario Desbordes (born 1968), Chilean politician and police officer 
 Michèle Desbordes (1940–2006), French writer